The Franklin County Courthouse and Jail in Mount Vernon, Texas was built in 1912.  It was listed on the National Register of Historic Places in 2006.  The listing includes two contributing buildings: the courthouse and the jail.

The design of a prior Franklin County courthouse, while not necessarily itself especially architecturally distinguished, was copied in the design of the Old Morris County Courthouse.  The prior courthouse was built in 1875.

Its successor, the present courthouse, built in 1912, was designed by L.L. Thurman in Classical Revival style.  The courthouse is a three-story sandstone building with full height columned and pedimented porticoes on two sides.  It has an octagonal, domed clock tower.

The jail, also built in 1912, is a square two-story small building.

Thurman also designed the Jeff Davis County Courthouse and the Kinney County Courthouse which are also listed on the National Register.

See also

National Register of Historic Places listings in Franklin County, Texas
List of county courthouses in Texas

References

External links

Courthouses in Texas
Courthouses on the National Register of Historic Places in Texas
National Register of Historic Places in Franklin County, Texas
Neoclassical architecture in Texas
Government buildings completed in 1912